The Woman Between is a 1931 American pre-Code drama film directed by Victor Schertzinger and written by Howard Estabrook. The film stars Lili Damita, Lester Vail, O.P. Heggie, Miriam Seegar and Anita Louise. It was released on August 8, 1931 by RKO Pictures.

Plot
A young man returns from Europe after several years of estrangement from his family caused by his disapproval of his father's remarriage after his mother's death. At the family reunion, he learns that his stepmother is the woman with whom he had a shipboard romance on the voyage home.

Cast
Lili Damita as Julie Whitcomb 
Lester Vail as Victor Whitcomb
O.P. Heggie as John Whitcomb
Miriam Seegar as Doris Whitcomb 
Anita Louise as Helen Weston
Ruth Weston as Mrs. Black
Lincoln Stedman as Buddy
Blanche Friderici as Mrs. Weston
William Morris as Frederick Weston
Halliwell Hobbes as Barton
George Chandler as Sweet, the last waiter to hold plate (uncredited)

References

External links

1931 films
American black-and-white films
1930s English-language films
RKO Pictures films
Films directed by Victor Schertzinger
1931 drama films
American drama films
1930s American films